Qodratabad (also Romanized as Qodratābād; also known as Alb-e Ḩamādī, Ālb-e Ḩemādī, and Omm ol Chīr) is a village in Bostan Rural District, Bostan District, Dasht-e Azadegan County, Khuzestan Province, Iran. At the 2006 census, its population was 232, in 42 families.

References 

Populated places in Dasht-e Azadegan County